Phillip Alan Griffith (born December 29, 1940) is a mathematician and professor emeritus at University of Illinois at Urbana-Champaign who works on commutative algebra and ring theory.  He received his PhD from the University of Houston in 1968.  Griffith is the editor-in-chief of the Illinois Journal of Mathematics  In 1971, Griffith received a Sloan Fellowship.

Publications

References

20th-century American mathematicians
Living people
University of Illinois Urbana-Champaign faculty
1940 births
University of Houston alumni
21st-century American mathematicians